Waterland is a 1992 British mystery drama film directed by Stephen Gyllenhaal and starring Jeremy Irons, Sinéad Cusack, Ethan Hawke and John Heard. It is based on Graham Swift's 1983 novel of the same name.

The film moved the contemporary location from England to Pittsburgh and eliminated many of the extensive historical asides.

Plot
The film follows the story of an anguished English-born Pittsburgh high school teacher (Irons) in 1974 going through a reassessment of his life. His method is to narrate his life to his class and interweave three generations of his family's history. The film portrays the history teacher's narrative in the form of flashbacks to tell the story of a teenage boy and his mentally challenged older brother living in The Fens of England with their widowed father. In an opening scene, the teacher's childless wife (Cusack) takes a child from a supermarket and believes it to be hers. The teacher explains to his class how he and his wife had a teenage romance, which led to a disastrous abortion that left her infertile. The teacher is tortured by the guilt of this, as well as the jealousy he demonstrated to his older brother when he suspected his girlfriend's child was his brother's. The girl's flirtation with the older brother sets off events that lead to the older boy's death by drowning. A side-theme is the teacher's grandfather, who was a successful brewer and who fathered with his daughter the narrator's older brother. The film ends with the teacher's dismissal from his school and a possible renewal of his relationship with his wife.

Cast 
 Jeremy Irons – Tom Crick 
 Sinéad Cusack – Mary Crick
 Ethan Hawke – Matthew Price
 John Heard - Lewis Scott
 Grant Warnock - Young Tom
 Lena Headey – Young Mary
 Pete Postlethwaite – Henry Crick 
 Cara Buono – Judy Dobson
 David Morrissey – Dick Crick
 Maggie Gyllenhaal - Maggie Ruth

Production
The film was one of the first two co-productions by Fine Line Features, a subsidiary of New Line Cinema.

The film was shot in Pittsburgh, Pennsylvania as well as parts of the UK including East Anglia, London and at Twickenham Film Studios. Part of the film was filmed at Doddington Place Gardens, near Faversham. The Victorian mansion was used as the ancestral home to Tom Crick.

Reception

References

External links 

1992 films
British mystery drama films
1990s mystery drama films
1990s English-language films
Films about educators
Films based on British novels
Films directed by Stephen Gyllenhaal
Films set in Pittsburgh
Fictional portrayals of the Pittsburgh Bureau of Police
Films scored by Carter Burwell
1992 drama films
1990s British films